The Green is a historic open-space located on Saint Helena Island near Frogmore, Beaufort County, South Carolina. It is the site of community meetings, celebrations, and other gatherings. The Green was the site of the first Darrah Hall, an auditorium and community center built about 1885 by Penn School, and destroyed in 1893.  Since that time the Green has continued to serve as a gathering place for the people of St. Helena Island. At the rear of The Green is the Knights of Wise Men Lodge.

It was listed in the National Register of Historic Places in 1988.

References

African-American history of South Carolina
Archaeological sites on the National Register of Historic Places in South Carolina
National Register of Historic Places in Beaufort County, South Carolina